Sakarya  is a province in Turkey, located on the coast of Black Sea. The Sakarya River creates a webbing of estuaries in the province, which is in the Marmara Region. The adjacent provinces are Kocaeli to the west, Bilecik to the south, Bolu to the southeast and Düzce to the east.
The capital of Sakarya is Adapazarı. Its climate is maritime in the north and humid subtropical in the south and changes by the distance to the Black Sea.
Sakarya is on the Ankara-Istanbul highway and is also connected by rail. Sakarya is serviced by Istanbul's Sabiha Gökçen International Airport. The current mayor of Sakarya is Ekrem Yüce as of 2019.  (AKP). The city of Sakarya, one of the most important cities in Turkey for its rapid growth and development, is also noteworthy for its natural beauties and its cultural richness. It is one of the paradise-like spots of the country with its sea, beaches, lakes, rivers, highlands, thermal springs, traditional Ottoman lifestyle districts such as Taraklı and Geyve and noteworthy historical relics that are inherited from the Byzantine and the Ottoman eras.
The Turks conquered the city of Sakarya in the 13th century. There was intensive immigration from the Caucasus and the Balkans in the 18th and the 19th centuries. The last massive immigration was in 1989 from Bulgaria. The city has developed industry from being a transportation crossroads and still has inward domestic migration. Sakarya is notable in the Marmara Region.
The city of Sakarya is surrounded with the city of Düzce in the east, Bolu in the south-east, Bilecik in the south, Kocaeli in the west and the Black Sea in the north. The city of Sakarya has 16 districts; Adapazarı, Akyazı, Arifiye, Erenler, Ferizli, Geyve, Hendek, Karapürçek, Karasu, Kaynarca, Kocaali, Pamukova, Sapanca, Serdivan, Söğütlü and Taraklı.

Transport 
Sakarya is located at the intersection of all the important roads and railways. The D-100 (E-5) highway, which has an important role on domestic and international transportation, passes through the city astward all along with TEM highway. Aling with the D-25 highway toward Bilecik, it is the city's main transportation axis. The Kınalı-İstanbul-Sakarya-Ankara highway, from Edirne, has an important international role. In Kınalı, one branch of the highway is connected to Greece, and the other branch is connected to Bulgaria. Here are the distances to some of the main cities from Sakarya: 797 km to Adana, 583 km to Antalya, 102 km to Bilecik, 158 km to Bursa, 188 km to Eskişehir, 148 km to İstanbul, 933 km to Trabzon, 306 km to Ankara, 114 km to Bolu, 486 km to İzmir, 79 km to Düzce, 708 km to Muğla, 179 km to Zonguldak and 37 km to Kocaeli.
There are seven railway stations throughout a 65 km railway inside the city limits. The railway connects Istanbul to Ankara and other Anatolian cities passes and through Sakarya. The distance from Sakarya to Istanbul by railway is 141 km and 436 km to Ankara.
The nearest airports to Adapazarı are the Sabiha Gökçen Airport, in Kurtköy – Istanbul, and the Istanbul Atatürk Airport, in Yeşilköy.

City of Sakarya 
Adapazarı was the village of Ada in 1573, a sub-district in 1646, a village in Akyazı in 1658, and administrative district of a qadi in 1692 and again a sub-district in 1742. The residency area had the status of a district between 1837 and 1954 during the Ottoman and the Republican eras. Adapazarı was a district of Kocaeli for many years but separated from it and took the name of Sakarya on June 22, 1954 by Law 6419. Adapazarı took the name of Sakarya since it was the centre of the districts f Akyazı, Geyve, Hendek and Karasu. On December 1, 1954, the first governor, Nazım Üner, began active duty with ceremonies.

Sakarya Metropolitan Municipality 
Adapazarı was experiencing a rapid growth and great development in the centre of Akova, but the city had to face massive destruction during the great Marmara earthquake, on August 17, 1999. There were 3891 residents who lost their lives, with 26,551 buildings collapsing and almost 100,000 people being left homeless. The city was trying to be reborn from its ashes with the help of state collaboration with Adapazarı Municipality, which had been founded in 1868. It gained the status of Metropolitan Municipality on March 6, 2000 by the publication of the council of the ministers' enactment 593 in the Official Journal. Adapazarı Mayor Aziz Duran was brought to the Adapazarı Metropolitan Mayor Office. With the legal amendments made in 2004 and 2008, the range and service area of the Metropolitan Municipality were extended. In 2008, legislation was passed to change the name of Adapazarı Metropolitan Municipality to Sakarya Metropolitan Municipality to prevent confusion. Sakarya Metropolitan Municipality has these 16 districts and more than 1,042,000 people:
 Adapazarı 
 Akyazı 
 Arifiye 
 Erenler 
 Ferizli 
 Geyve
 Hendek 
 Karapürçek 
 Karasu
 Kaynarca
 Kocaali
 Pamukova
 Sapanca 
 Serdivan 
 Söğütlü 
 Taraklı

Sakarya Metropolitian Muncipality 
 1984-1989 Erkal Etçioğlu ANAP
 1989-1994 Ünal Ozan SHP
 1994-1999 Aziz Duran Refah Party
 1999-2002 Aziz Duran FP
 2002-2009 Aziz Duran AK Party
 2009-2019 Zeki Toçoğlu AK Party
 2019-present Ekrem Yüce AK Party

See also 
 East Marmara Development Agency

References

External links 

  Sakarya governor's official website
  Sakarya municipality's official website
  Cark Caddesi
  Sakarya weather forecast information
 Sakarya University homepage